Heuckewalde is a village and a former municipality in the Burgenlandkreis district, in Saxony-Anhalt, Germany. Since 1 January 2010, it has been part of the Gutenborn municipality.

Former municipalities in Saxony-Anhalt
Burgenlandkreis